The Hiellen River is a river on Graham Island in the Queen Charlotte Islands of British Columbia, Canada.  It flows north into McIntyre Bay to the east of Tow Hill, and is entirely within Naikoon Provincial Park, which covers most of the peninsula of the same name.  At the mouth of the Hiellen River is Hiellen Indian Reserve No. 2, which is on the site of Hiellen, a once-large Haida village whose remaining families located to Masset during the 19th Century.

References

Rivers of Haida Gwaii
Graham Island